Rubén Darío Ramirez Lezcano (born 11 January 1966 in Asunción) is a Paraguayan politician.

Biography

Education
Ramirez studied economics and received a Bachelor of Science and Arts at the College St. Teresa of Ciudad del Este (Paraguay). University degree in Economics, graduated from the Faculty of Economics and Social Sciences of the University of Buenos Aires (1987). Master's degree in International Politics at the University of Sorbonne in Paris (1989). Degree in Business Administration at the University of California, Los Angeles Anderson Business School (1998).

Career

He was Manager of Commercial Department at the Embassy of Paraguay in Buenos Aires, Argentina from 1989 to 1992, chargé d'affaires and 1st Secretary in the Paraguayan Embassy in Quito - Ecuador from 1992 to 1994, Director General of the National Foreign Trade Council, Ministry of Foreign You relate from 1994 and 1996, Alternate Representative to UNESCO, the Embassy of Paraguay in Paris, France from 1996 to 1998, Consul General of Paraguay in Los Angeles, California, USA. UU. from 1998 to 1999, Managing Director of Export Promotion and Investment, Ministry of Foreign Affairs from 1999 to 2000.  
Minister of Embassy Deputy Permanent Representative of Paraguay to the Latin American Integration Association (LAIA), Montevideo, Uruguay in 2000, Alternate Representative of Paraguay to the United Nations in MisionPar in Geneva, Switzerland  in 2001, Coordinator of the Common Market by Paraguay (2004) Promoted to the rank of Ambassador by Rank Diplomat, Ministry of Foreign Affairs in 2004, Vice Minister of Economic Relations and Integration of the Ministry of Foreign Affairs in 2004, Former Vice Minister of Economic Relations and Integration of the Ministry of Foreign Affairs, Dec. 17. 2004, Minister of Foreign Affairs in the Cabinet of President Duarte Frutos by Executive Decree No. 8072 of August 22, 2006.  
He was Minister of Foreign Relations in the cabinet of President Nicanor Duarte Frutos (2006-2008).

In 2016, he campaigned for President of Paraguay and was nominated as a candidate by the Corporacion Andina de Fomento.

References

External links
 Minister Ramírez Lezcano

1966 births
People from Asunción
University of Buenos Aires alumni
University of Paris alumni
University of California, Los Angeles alumni
Paraguayan economists
Paraguayan diplomats
Foreign Ministers of Paraguay
Living people